Freedom to Die is a 1961 British crime thriller film directed by Francis Searle.

Cast
 Paul Maxwell as Craig Owen
 Felicity Young as Linda
 Bruce Seton as Felix
 Kay Callard as Coral
 T.P. McKenna as Mike
 Laurie Leigh as Julie

References

External links

1961 films
British crime thriller films
Films directed by Francis Searle
1960s English-language films
1960s British films